At approximately 2:20 a.m. on February 24, 2019, Paul Terry Murdaugh crashed his family boat into the Archers Creek Bridge in Beaufort, South Carolina. On board the boat at the time of the accident were Mallory Beach and several other teenagers. Beach was killed in the accident and Murdaugh was charged in relation to the accident. 

Paul was murdered along with his mother in 2021, and his father, Alex Murdaugh was found guilty of their murders on March 3, 2023.

Mallory Beach
Mallory Madison Beach was born to Phillip Harley and Renee Searson Beach on April 18, 1999, in Walterboro, South Carolina. She was a Wade Hampton High School graduate. At the time of her death, the 19-year-old was attending college and working at a clothing store.

Accident 
Paul Murdaugh purchased alcohol in the hours before the accident at a convenience store in Ridgeland, South Carolina using his brother's ID. Three couples, including Beach and her boyfriend and Murdaugh and his former girlfriend, met at Murdaugh's grandfather's Chechesee River house and boarded a center console boat to travel to an oyster roast. At 1 a.m., during the return trip, they stopped at a dockside bar in Beaufort where Murdaugh and another passenger drank shots. Murdaugh began behaving erratically, and while other passengers asked him to allow someone else to drive the boat, he refused. At 2:20 a.m. the boat hit a piling on the bridge to Parris Island.

Following the accident 
The passengers were transported to a nearby hospital, except for Beach's boyfriend, who insisted on staying behind to wait for news about Beach. Investigators and volunteers spent eight days searching for Beach, according to CBS News. On March 3, 2019, two volunteers found her body about five miles down the river from the scene of the crash.  According to the coroner's office, Beach died from drowning and blunt force trauma.  

Several of the teens were injured and required surgery. Paul Murdaugh was uncooperative with medical staff. Several hours after the crash, his blood alcohol content was .24, three times the legal limit. Paul and Alex claimed that one of the other teens had been driving the boat; however evidence from his injuries proved the other teen was a passenger, and he was not charged.

Paul Murdaugh was charged with three felony counts, including boating under the influence and boating under the influence causing death. Paul pleaded not guilty and was released on bond. On June 7, 2021, Paul and his mother Maggie were murdered, and the charges against the now-deceased Paul were dropped. His father, Alex Murdaugh, was charged with homicide over 13 months later, on July 15, 2022, and was found guilty at trial.

Lawsuits 
Beach's mother Renee Beach filed a lawsuit against several members of the Murdaugh family: Paul, who was driving the boat; Paul's brother, who allegedly lent the underage Paul his driver's license so that he could obtain alcohol; and Paul's mother Maggie, who allegedly allowed Paul to use the boat while drinking. Alex Murdaugh and the store where the underage teens bought the alcohol were also named in the lawsuit, which was settled in January 2023. Suits were also filed against other Murdaugh family members, the hosts of the oyster roast, the owner of the bar where Murdaugh drank shots after the oyster roast; and the owner of the convenience store that sold Murdaugh alcohol.

References 

2019 deaths
Boating accident deaths
Accidental deaths in South Carolina
Deaths by person in South Carolina
Alcohol-related deaths in South Carolina
Women deaths
2019 in South Carolina
Murdaugh family